Hermann Schneider may refer to:

 Hermann Schneider (boxer), Swiss boxer
 Hermann Schneider (footballer) (1877–?), Swiss footballer
 Hermann Schneider (philologist) (1886-1961), German philologist